On January 7, 1948, 25-year-old Captain Thomas F. Mantell, a Kentucky Air National Guard pilot, died in the crash of his P-51 Mustang fighter plane near Franklin, Kentucky, United States, after being sent in pursuit of an unidentified flying object (UFO). The event was among the most publicized early UFO incidents.

Later investigation by the United States Air Force's Project Blue Book indicated that Mantell may have died chasing a Skyhook balloon, which in 1948 was a top-secret project that he would not have known about. Mantell pursued the object in a steep climb and disregarded suggestions to level his altitude. At high altitude he blacked out from a lack of oxygen; his plane went into a downward spiral and crashed.

In 1956, Air Force Captain Edward J. Ruppelt (the first head of Project Blue Book) wrote that the Mantell crash was one of three "classic" UFO cases in 1948 that would help to define the UFO phenomenon in the public mind, and would help convince some Air Force intelligence specialists that UFOs were a "real" physical phenomenon. Ruppelt's other two "classic" sightings in 1948 were the Chiles-Whitted UFO encounter and the Gorman dogfight.

Historian David M. Jacobs argues the Mantell case marked a sharp shift in both public and governmental perceptions of UFOs. Previously, the press often treated UFO reports with a whimsical or glib attitude reserved for “silly season news.” Following Mantell's death, however, Jacobs notes "the fact that a person had died in an encounter with an alleged flying saucer dramatically increased public concern about the phenomenon. Now a dramatic new prospect entered thought about UFOs: they might be not only extraterrestrial but potentially hostile as well."

Incident

On 7 January 1948, Godman Army Airfield at Fort Knox, Kentucky, received a report from the Kentucky Highway Patrol of an unusual aerial object near Madisonville. Reports of a westbound circular object,  in diameter, were received from Owensboro and Irvington. At about 1:45 p.m., Sergeant Quinton Blackwell saw an object from his position in the control tower at Fort Knox. Two other witnesses in the tower also reported a white object in the distance. Colonel Guy Hix, the base commander, reported an object he described as "very white," and "about one fourth the size of the full moon ... Through binoculars it appeared to have a red border at the bottom ... It remained stationary, seemingly, for one and a half hours." Observers at Clinton County Army Air Field in Ohio described the object "as having the appearance of a flaming red cone trailing a gaseous green mist" and observed the object for around 35 minutes. Another observer at Lockbourne Army Air Field in Ohio noted, "Just before leaving it came to very near the ground, staying down for about ten seconds, then climbed at a very fast rate back to its original altitude, leveling off and disappearing into the overcast heading 120 degrees.

Four F-51D Mustangs of C Flight, 165th Fighter Squadron Kentucky Air National Guard—one piloted by Captain Thomas F. Mantell—were already in the air and told to approach the object. Blackwell was in radio communication with the pilots throughout the event. One pilot's Mustang was low on fuel and he quickly returned to base. The other two pilots accompanied Mantell in steep pursuit of the object. They later reported they saw an object but described it as so small and indistinct that they could not identify it. Mantell ignored suggestions that the pilots should level their altitude and try to more clearly see the object. Ruppelt notes that there was some disagreement amongst the air traffic controllers as to Mantell's words as he communicated with the tower: some sources reported that Mantell had described an object "[which] looks metallic and of tremendous size," but according to Ruppelt, others disputed whether or not Mantell actually said this.

Only one of Mantell's wingmen, Lt. Albert Clements, had an oxygen mask, and his oxygen was in low supply. However, Mantell continued to climb. According to the United States Air Force, once Mantell passed  he blacked out from lack of oxygen and his plane began spiraling back towards the ground. A witness later reported Mantell's Mustang in a circling descent. His plane crashed on a farm south of Franklin, on Kentucky's border with Tennessee. Firemen later pulled Mantell's body from the wreckage. His seat belt was shredded and his wristwatch had stopped at 3:18 p.m., the time of his crash. Meanwhile, by 3:50 p.m. the UFO was no longer visible to observers at Godman Army Airfield. 

The Mantell incident was reported by newspapers around the nation, and received significant press attention. A number of sensational rumors were also circulated about the crash. According to UFO historian Curtis Peebles, among the rumors were claims that "the flying saucer was a Soviet missile; it was [an alien] spacecraft that shot down [Mantell's fighter] when it got too close; Captain Mantell's body was found riddled with bullets; the body was missing; the plane had completely disintegrated in the air; [and] the wreckage was radioactive." However, no evidence has ever surfaced to substantiate any of these claims, and Air Force investigation specifically refuted some claims, such as the supposedly radioactive wreckage. Ruppelt wrote that, "I had always heard a lot of wild speculation about the condition of Mantell's crashed F-51, so I wired for a copy of the accident report. [It] said that...Mantell's body had not burned, not disintegrated, and was not full of holes; the wreck was not radioactive, nor was it magnetized." Mantell was the first member of the Kentucky Air National Guard to die in flight. According to John Trowbridge, historian of the Kentucky National Guard, "There is a real X-Files twist to this, too. Mantell lived almost his entire life in Louisville, but he was born in a hospital in Franklin, only a few miles from where he was killed."

Venus explanation and rejection
The Mantell crash was investigated by Project Sign, the first Air Force research group assigned to investigate UFO reports. Ruppelt noted that, "The people on Project Sign worked fast on the Mantell Incident. Contemplating a flood of queries from the press as soon as they heard about the crash, they realized that they had to get a quick answer. Venus had been the target of a chase by an Air Force F-51 several weeks before and there were similarities between this sighting and the Mantell Incident. So...the word 'Venus' went out. Mantell had unfortunately been killed trying to reach the planet Venus." An Air Force major who was interviewed by several reporters following Mantell's crash "flatly stated that it was Venus."

In 1952, USAF Captain Edward Ruppelt, the supervisor of Project Blue Book, Project Sign's successor, was ordered to reinvestigate the Mantell Incident. Ruppelt spoke with J. Allen Hynek, an astronomer at Ohio State University and scientific consultant to Project Sign and Project Blue Book. Hynek had supplied Project Sign with the Venus explanation in 1948, mainly because Venus had been in the same place in the sky that Mantell's UFO was observed. However, by 1952 Hynek had concluded that the Venus explanation was incorrect, because "Venus wasn't bright enough to be seen" by Mantell and the other witnesses, and because a considerable haze was present that would have further obscured the planet in the sky. Ruppelt also noted Hynek's statement that Venus, even if visible, would have been a "pinpoint of light", but that eyewitness "descriptions plainly indicated a large object. None of the descriptions could even vaguely be called a pinpoint of light."

Skyhook balloon explanation
Having rejected the Venus explanation, Ruppelt began to research other explanations for the Mantell incident. He was particularly interested in a suggestion by Hynek that Mantell could have misidentified a United States Navy Skyhook  weather balloon. In Madisonville "the object was seen through a telescope [and] identified as a balloon by one observer." Additionally, between 4:30 and 4:45 PM an astronomer at Vanderbilt University "watched an object in the sky...viewed through binoculars, he said it was a pear-shaped balloon with cables and a basket attached." 

However, others disputed this idea, noting that no particular Skyhook balloon could be conclusively identified as being in the area in question during Mantell's pursuit. Since the Skyhook balloons were secret at the time, neither Mantell nor the other observers in the control tower would have been able to identify the UFO as a Skyhook. But this was never proved, as Ruppelt wrote. However, it has also been reported that an astronomer at Vanderbilt University saw the balloon through a telescope.

Inexperience with the P-51
Researchers have also noted that while Mantell was an experienced pilot, he was rather new to the P-51, and that this relative inexperience could have been a factor in the crash. This does not, however, account for the identity of the UFO.

Thomas Mantell biography

Captain Thomas Francis Mantell Jr. (30 June 1922 – 7 January 1948) was a United States Air Force officer and a World War II veteran. He was awarded the Distinguished Flying Cross for courageous action during Operation Market Garden, and an Air Medal with three oak leaf clusters for aerial achievement.

Career
Mantell graduated from Male High School in Louisville. On 16 June 1942, he joined the United States Army Air Corps, the preceding organization to the Air Force, finishing Flight School on 30 June 1943. During World War II, he was a C-47 Skytrain pilot assigned to the 96th Troop Carrier Squadron, 440th Troop Carrier Group, which air dropped the 101st Airborne Division into Normandy on 6 June 1944 and participated in Operation Market Garden.  

Mantell, then a lieutenant, was awarded the Distinguished Flying Cross for heroism while flying over the Netherlands on 18 September 1944 during Operation Market Garden. While piloting a C-47 named Vulture's Delight, which was towing a glider, his plane came under heavy anti-aircraft fire. All but one of the rudder and elevator controls were disabled, and the C-47's tail was afire. Mantell's crew chief fought the fire with live ammunition detonating. Rather than release the glider, Mantell decided to continue with his mission. The glider was released at the correct location, and Mantell returned to base. Upon inspection, the C-47 was so damaged that it appeared to be unable to fly.  Mantell was nicknamed "Shiny" by his comrades for his "constant well-scrubbed look." He was also described as "able to think fast and act quickly."

After the war, Mantell returned to Louisville and joined the newly formed Kentucky Air National Guard on 16 February 1947, becoming a F-51D Mustang pilot in the 165th Fighter Squadron.

Following his death in January 1948, Mantell's remains were sent to Louisville for burial in the Zachary Taylor National Cemetery.
He was survived by his wife Peggy and their sons, Thomas and Terry Mantell.

On 29 September 2001, the Simpson County Historical Society unveiled a historical marker in honor of Mantell in his hometown of Franklin. The marker is located at the exit off Interstate 65.

Awards
 Pilot Badge
 Distinguished Flying Cross
 Air Medal with three oak leaf clusters
 Distinguished Unit Citation
 American Campaign Medal
 European–African–Middle Eastern Campaign Medal with two campaign stars
 World War II Victory Medal

Legacy
The Mantell incident is one of the earliest UFO incidents to attract widespread public attention. It is considered one of the "classic" UFO incidents from the late 1940s.

The Mantell incident was featured in the 1956 quasi-documentary Unidentified Flying Objects: The True Story of Flying Saucers. The film helped spur public interest in UFOs and speculation that UFOs were of extraterrestrial origin. The incident was also featured in the 1975 Toei Animation film Kore ga UFO da! Soratobu Enban(これがＵＦＯだ！ 空飛ぶ円盤), albeit with several inaccuracies--for example, the UFO is shown as a disc rather than a cone.

The Mantell incident inspired the 1956 kaiju film, Rodan.

See also
 List of reported UFO sightings
 Project Mogul
 List of unusual deaths

References

Additional references

 Jerome Clark. (1998). The UFO Book: Encyclopedia of the Extraterrestrial, Visible Ink, 
 David Michael Jacobs. (1975). The UFO Controversy In America, Indiana University Press, 
 Philip J. Klass. (1974).  UFOs Explained,  Random House, hardback ; Vintage Books, paperback 
 Curtis Peebles. (1994). Watch the Skies! A Chronicle of the Flying Saucer Myth, Smithsonian Institution,  
 Edward J. Ruppelt. (1956). The Report on Unidentified Flying Objects, Doubleday Books

External links
 UFO Casebook: The Death of Thomas Mantell (includes official documents)
 1948-Death of Thomas Mantell:By Billy Booth, About.com

1948 in Kentucky
1948 in military history
Alleged UFO-related aviation incidents
Aviation accidents and incidents in Kentucky
Aviation accidents and incidents in the United States in 1948
January 1948 events in the United States
North American P-51 Mustang
Simpson County, Kentucky
UFO sightings in the United States
United States Air National Guard
Kentucky National Guard